St. Joseph's Institute of Management (SJIM) is a private graduate school of business located in Bangalore, India. It is part of St. Joseph's Institutions. It offers a two-year full-time PGDM program and is approved by All India Council for Technical Education, New Delhi

History 
St. Joseph's Institute of Management (formerly known as St Joseph’s College of Business Administration) was established in 1968. It is situated off MG Road, central business district of Bangalore. It is one of the oldest management institutes in the state of Karnataka which is managed by the members of the Society of Jesus called Jesuits. In 1996, SJIM secured approval from AICTE, New Delhi, for a two-year full-time PGDM program. In 2007, SJIM got approval from the AICTE for offering the Executive PGDM and PGCM programs. The institute was shifted to a new campus located off MG Road, Bangalore in 2016 and it was inaugurated by Mr Rahul Dravid, the former captain of Indian Cricket team who himself was an alumnus of St. Joseph’s Boys’ High School and St. Joseph’s College of Commerce.  On 27 November 2018, SJIM celebrated the Golden Jubilee to commemorate the establishment of the institute in 1968. Shri Pranab Mukherjee, the former President of India was the chief guest at the event. The institute celebrated the silver jubilee of the commencement of PGDM program on 19 March 2021. Prof Anil Sahasrabudhe, the Chairman of All India Council for Technical Education (AICTE) was the chief guest for the event. The institute prides of a student profile with diverse educational background and corporate exposure. SJIM is a member of International Association of Jesuit Business Schools (IAJBS) and Xavier Association of Management Institutions (XAMI).

Academic programs

Post Graduate Diploma in Management (PGDM) 
It is the flagship program of the institute of two-year duration. The whole program is broken into six trimesters. Students take up industry internships for eight weeks after the third trimester. The institute offers dual specialization in Finance, Marketing, Human Resource Management and Operations. Specializations are:

Finance and Marketing

Human Resource Management and Finance

Marketing and Human Resource Management

Finance and Operations

Marketing and Operations

Doctor of Philosophy(Ph.D) 
St. Joseph’s Institute of Management (SJIM)  has been recognized as a Research Centre by the University of Mysore from the academic year 2021-22 onwards. SJIM offers doctoral program in areas like Organizational Behaviour, Commerce, Marketing, Finance, Human Resource Management.

Rankings 

In 2018, SJIM was listed among the top three business schools in Bangalore by the National Institutional Ranking Framework (NIRF), behind IIM-B and XIME. NIRF also listed St Joseph's Institute of Management among the top seven in Karnataka, from over forty-five participating institutes.

MBAUniverse.com ranked SJIM 59th in India in 2020.

Student Events 

Verve is a national level inter-collegiate management fest wherein the institute hosts events in Finance, Marketing, Human Resources, Operations, Entrepreneurship, Stocks, Best Manager and Quiz.

Pinnacle is an intra-collegiate management fest where events are conducted across various management domains.

International B-Plan competition is held every year between SJIM and Albers School of Business, US.

Chintana- A national level Case Study Competition.

International collaboration 
SJIM currently has collaboration with four international institutions.

In 2017, SJIM entered into an agreement with Albers School of Business and Economics, an AACSB Jesuits business school that is part of Seattle University, USA. Joint activities have included guest lectures in SJIM by Albers faculty, research collaboration, and an international business plan competition.

SJIM's collaboration with the University of Central Oklahoma, USA facilitates desirous students from the institute to pursue their summer internship in the USA.

Other ongoing collaborations include those with Fu Jen Catholic University in Taiwan and Putra Business School in Malaysia.

Eminent Social Entrepreneur of the Year Award 
On the occasion of the silver Jubilee of the PGDM program, SJIM has instituted annual Eminent Social Entrepreneur of the Year Award to recognize a sound business model that has impactfully addressed a social or environmental injustice. The 2021 SJIM Eminent Social Entrepreneur of the Year Award was awarded to Teach for India (TFI).

International Leadership Conference- Utkarsh 
St. Joseph's Institute of Management has created a platform, SJIM Leadership Network.

See also
 List of Jesuit sites

References

Business schools in Bangalore
Jesuit universities and colleges in India
Colleges in Bangalore
Business schools in Karnataka
Christian universities and colleges in India
Educational institutions established in 1968